Gompers School, also known as Eastern High School and Samuel Gompers General Vocational School, is a historic high school located at Baltimore, Maryland, United States. It was designed and built during a period from 1904 to 1906 as a public high school and remained as an educational facility until its closing in 1981. It is a flat-roofed building on four floor levels, roughly square in plan.  The interior layout is characterized by a series of classrooms ringing an open court to allow maximum ventilation and light.

Gompers School was listed on the National Register of Historic Places in 1985.

References

External links
, including photo from 1984, at Maryland Historical Trust

Broadway East, Baltimore
Defunct schools in Maryland
Buildings and structures in Baltimore
School buildings on the National Register of Historic Places in Baltimore
Neoclassical architecture in Maryland
School buildings completed in 1905
1905 establishments in Maryland